Theo de Raadt (born May 19, 1968) is a South African-born software engineer who lives in Calgary, Alberta, Canada. He is the founder and leader of the OpenBSD and OpenSSH projects and was also a founding member of NetBSD. In 2004, De Raadt won the Free Software Award for his work on OpenBSD and OpenSSH.

Early life 
Theo de Raadt is the eldest of four children to a Dutch father and a South African mother, with two sisters and a brother. Concern over the mandatory two-year armed forces conscription in South Africa led the family to emigrate to Calgary, Alberta, Canada in November 1977. In 1983, the largest recession in Canada since the Great Depression sent the family to the Yukon. Prior to the move, De Raadt got his first computer, a VIC-20, which was soon followed by an Amiga. It is with these computers that he first began to develop software. In 1992, he obtained a BSc in Computer Science from the University of Calgary.

NetBSD 

In 1993, Theo de Raadt founded NetBSD with Chris Demetriou, Adam Glass, and Charles Hannum, who felt frustrated at the poor quality of 386BSD and believed an open development model would be better.   386BSD was derived from the original University of California Berkeley's 4.3BSD release, while the new NetBSD project would merge relevant code from the Networking/2 and 386BSD releases.

The new project focused on clean, portable, correct code, with the goal of producing a unified, multi-platform, production-quality BSD operating system.

The first NetBSD source code repository was established on March 21, 1993 and the initial release, NetBSD 0.8, was made in April 1993.  This was derived from 386BSD 0.1 plus the version 0.2.2 unofficial patchkit, with several programs from the Net/2 release missing from 386BSD re-integrated, and various other improvements.  In August 1993, NetBSD 0.9 was released, which contained many enhancements and bug fixes. This was still a PC-platform-only release, although by this time work was underway to add support for other architectures.

NetBSD 1.0 was released in October, 1994.  This was the first multi-platform release, supporting the IBM PC compatible, HP 9000 Series 300, Amiga, 68k Macintosh, Sun-4c series and PC532.  Also in this release, the legally encumbered Net/2-derived source code was replaced with equivalent code from 4.4BSD-lite, in accordance with the  USL v BSDi lawsuit settlement.  De Raadt played a vital role in the creation of the SPARC port, implementing much of the initial code together with  Chuck Cranor.

OpenBSD 

In December 1994, Theo de Raadt was forced to resign from the NetBSD core team, and his access to the source repository was revoked. Fellow team members claimed it was due to rude and abusive behaviour on the mailing lists.

In his book Free for All, Peter Wayner claims that De Raadt "began to rub some people the wrong way" before the split from NetBSD, while Linus Torvalds has described him as "difficult". Many have different feelings: the same interviewer describes De Raadt's "transformation" on founding OpenBSD and his "desire to take care of his team," some find his straightforwardness refreshing, and De Raadt remains widely respected as a hacker and security expert.

In October 1995, De Raadt founded OpenBSD, a new project forked from NetBSD 1.0. The initial release, OpenBSD 1.2, was made in July 1996, followed in October of the same year by OpenBSD 2.0. Since then, the project has followed a schedule of a release every six months, each of which is maintained and supported for one year.

Outspokenness 

De Raadt has been a vocal advocate of free software since the inception of OpenBSD, but he has on occasion had rather public disputes with various groups, from Linux advocates to governments.  This outspoken attitude, while sometimes the cause of conflict, has also led him to acclaim; De Raadt has given presentations at open source, free software and security conferences around the world—including FOSDEM in Brussels, Belgium, Usenix in San Antonio, Texas, U.S., AUUG Conference in Melbourne, Australia and FISL in Porto Alegre, RS, Brazil.

DARPA funding cancellation 

After De Raadt stated his disapproval of the U.S.-led invasion of Iraq in an April, 2003 interview with Toronto's Globe and Mail, a multi-million-dollar US Department of Defense grant to the University of Pennsylvania's POSSE project was cancelled, effectively ending the project.  Funding from the grant had been used in the development of OpenSSH and OpenBSD, as well as many other projects and was to be used to pay for the hackathon planned for May 8, 2003.  Despite money from the grant already having been used to secure accommodations for sixty developers for a week, the money was reclaimed by the government at a loss and the hotel was told not to allow the developers to pay the reclaimed money to resecure the rooms.  This resulted in criticism among some that the US military held an anti-free speech attitude. The grant termination was, however, not as bad a blow as some portrayed it.  The project's supporters rallied to help and the hackathon went on almost as planned.  The funding was cut mere months before the end of the grant, further fueling the speculations regarding the situation surrounding the grant's termination.

Free driver advocacy 

De Raadt is also well known for his advocacy of free software drivers.  He has long been critical of developers of Linux and other free platforms for their tolerance of non-free drivers and acceptance of non-disclosure agreements.

In particular, De Raadt has worked to convince wireless hardware vendors to allow the firmware images of their products to be freely redistributed. These efforts have been largely successful, particularly in negotiations with Taiwanese companies, leading to many new wireless drivers. De Raadt has commented that "most Taiwanese vendors give us documentation almost immediately," allowing open source drivers to reliably support devices, as opposed to the lack of willingness from US companies like Intel and Broadcom to release firmware images free from licensing restrictions.

Clash with Linux developers
In April 2007, De Raadt was involved in a controversy involving the use of GPL code from the Linux bcm43xx driver in the BSD bcw driver.  Linux developers accused the BSD community of infringing GPL code, but De Raadt denied infringement, arguing that the BSD driver was not "released".  He also maintained that the conflict was not about GPL, but the way Linux developer Michael Buesch handled the situation.  To Buesch's email, he responded:

Another clash occurred in August 2007, when a group of Linux developers attempted to modify the license of dual-licensed ath5k driver. De Raadt summarised the issue as follows:

References

External links

2000 interview at Slashdot
2001 interview at KernelTrap
2006 interview at KernelTrap

Canadian software engineers
Computer security specialists
Free software programmers
NetBSD people
OpenBSD people
People from Calgary
South African emigrants to Canada
Canadian people of Afrikaner descent
Canadian people of Dutch descent
1968 births
Living people
Kernel programmers
University of Calgary alumni